Monroe High School is a public high school, serving students in grades 9–12 as a part of Monroe Public Schools.

Demographics
The demographic breakdown of the 1,841 students enrolled in 2014-2015 was:
Male - 52.5%
Female - 47.5%
Native American/Alaskan - 0.2%
Asian/Pacific islanders - 0.7%
Black - 10.3%
Hispanic - 4.1%
White - 83.6%
Multiracial - 1.1%

47.1% of the students were eligible for free or reduced price lunch.

Athletics
The Monroe Trojans compete in the Southeastern Conference.  The school colors are red and white. The following MHSAA sanctioned sports are offered:

Baseball (boys')
Basketball (girls' and boys')
Bowling (girls' and boys')
Competitive cheer (girls')
Cross country (girls' and boys')
Football (boys')
Golf (girl' and boys')
Gymnastics (girls')
Ice hockey (boys')
Soccer (girls' and boys')
Softball (girls')
Swimming and diving (girls' and boys')
Tennis (girls' and boys')
Track and field (girls' and boys')
Boys' state champions - 1931, 1936, 1937
Volleyball (girls')
Wrestling (boys')

Notable alumni
 Audie Cole (2007): NFL linebacker
 Carl Ford (1999): NFL wide receiver 
 John C. Lehr (1897): Democratic US Representative for Michigan's 2nd congressional district 
 Bronco McKart (1989): boxer 
 Eric Wilson (1996): NFL and CFL defensive tackle

References

External links

District website

Public high schools in Michigan
Schools in Monroe County, Michigan